Abbie McKay is an Australian rules footballer playing for Carlton in the AFL Women's competition (AFLW). She was selected by Carlton with the 16th pick in the 2018 draft as the first woman selected under the father-daughter rule. Her father, Andrew was a premiership player for Carlton in 1995.

McKay was educated at Melbourne Girls Grammar

AFLW career 
McKay made her debut against  in round 4. After managing 4 games in her debut AFLW season, she played 12 games in the VFLW in 2019, kicking 3 goals and averaging 15 disposals, 10 contested possessions and 3.5 clearances. McKay struggled to break into the senior team in 2020, not playing any games at the highest level. McKay won a 2021 AFL Women's Rising Star nomination in the third round of the 2021 AFL Women's season after her 17 disposal, 7 tackle game against . This game saw her break her disposals record and equal her tackles record.

Statistics
Statistics are correct to round 3 of the 2021 season. 

|- style="background:#EAEAEA"
| scope="row" text-align:center | 2019
| 
| 5 || 4 || 0 || 1 || 9 || 21 || 30 || 3 || 6 || 0.0 || 0.3 || 2.3 || 5.3 || 7.5 || 0.8 || 1.5 || 0
|-
| scope="row" text-align:center | 2020
| 
| 5 || 0 || — || — || — || — || — || — || — || — || — || — || — || — || — || — || 0
|- style="background:#EAEAEA"
| scope="row" text-align:center | 2021
| 
| 5 || 3 || 0 || 1 || 7 || 36 || 43 || 1 || 20 || 0.0 || 0.3 || 2.3 || 12.0 || 14.3 || 0.3 || 6.7 || 
|- class="sortbottom"
! colspan=3 | Career
! 7
! 0 
! 2
! 16
! 57
! 73
! 4
! 26
! 0.0
! 0.3 
! 2.3
! 8.1
! 10.4 
! 0.6
! 3.7
! 0
|}

References

External links

2000 births
Living people
Sportswomen from Victoria (Australia)
Australian rules footballers from Victoria (Australia)
Sandringham Dragons players (NAB League Girls)
Carlton Football Club (AFLW) players
People educated at Melbourne Girls Grammar